The 9th Saturn Awards, honoring the best in science fiction, fantasy and horror film in 1981, were held on July 27, 1982. It was hosted by Sandahl Bergman and Richard Lynch at the Director's Guild Theater Complex on Sunset Boulevard in Los Angeles, California.

Winners and nominees
Below is a complete list of nominees and winners. Winners are highlighted in bold.

Film awards

Special awards

Service Award
 Gary "Zak" Sakharoff

President's Award
 Time Bandits

Life Career Award
 Ray Harryhausen

Outstanding Film Award
 Quest for Fire

Executive Achievement Award
 Hans J. Salter

Golden Scroll of Merit (Outstanding Achievement)
 Bo Svenson – Butcher, Baker, Nightmare Maker

References

External links
 1982 Awards at IMDb
 Official Saturn Awards website

Saturn
Saturn Awards ceremonies